Monte Kaolino is a sand dune in Hirschau, Bavaria, Germany. The sand dune is now used as a ski resort for sand skiing and sandboarding, in addition to other activities.

Sand-skiing and sandboarding

By the 1950s the pile of sand had grown large enough that people experimented with skiing on it, and in 1956 a ski club was formed. Uniquely to this hill, skiing is done directly on the sand and as a result, its operating season is inverse with ski areas elsewhere - it only opens in summer, even though the area does snow in winter.

The hill is home to the Sandboarding World Championships.

Recent history
The area was extensively renovated in 2007. In addition to the ski hill, there are also camping facilities, a pool, a geopark, and trails.

In 2009 a funicular elevator to the top of the hill was installed.

See also 
 List of funicular railways

References

External links
Official site
Article about the place

Amberg-Sulzbach
Ski areas and resorts in Germany
Sandboarding locations
Artificial hills